Each year, prior to the beginning of each event, the Cannes Film Festival board of directors appoints the juries who hold sole responsibility for choosing which films will receive an award. Jurors are chosen from a wide range of international artists, based on their body of work and respect from their peers. The jury president is an internationally recognized personality of cinema. This list covers the juries for the "Feature films".

The Official Selection - In Competition juries 

An international jury composed of a president and various film, culture, and art personalities, who determine the prizes for the feature films in the competition.

Since 1960, there has been only one personality to get the honor of being president of the jury twice: Jeanne Moreau in 1975 and 1995. The last non-professional film personality to be president of the jury is the American writer William Styron in 1983.

Multiple appearances 
 Marcel Achard - 1955, 1958, 1959, 1966
 Pedro Almodóvar - 1992, 2017
 Mme. Georges Bidault - 1949, 1951, 1952
 Tim Burton - 1997, 2010
 Louis Chauvet - 1951, 1952, 1953, 1960
 Jean Cocteau - 1953, 1954
 Tonino Delli Colli - 1961, 1986
 Guy Desson - 1951, 1952, 1953, 1954
 Kirk Douglas - 1970, 1980
 Jacques-Pierre Frogerais - 1949, 1952, 1953, 1954, 1955, 1956
 Tetsuro Furukaki - 1962, 1966
 Georges Huisman - 1946, 1947, 1949, 1957
 Isabelle Huppert - 1984, 2009
 Jacques Ibert - 1951, 1954
 André Lang - 1952, 1953, 1954
 Maurice Lehmann - 1956, 1957, 1966
 Louis Malle - 1968, 1993
 André Maurois - 1951, 1957, 1966
 George Miller - 1988, 1999, 2016
 Jeanne Moreau - 1975, 1995
 Nanni Moretti - 1997, 2012
 Marcel Pagnol  - 1955, 1957, 1966
 Sydney Pollack - 1973, 1986
 Roman Polanski - 1968, 1991
 Georges Raguis - 1947, 1949, 1951, 1952, 1953, 1954
 Yuli Raizman - 1962, 1966
 René Jeanne - 1947, 1949, 1951
 Carlo Rim - 1949, 1951
 Robert Rozhdestvensky - 1968, 1973, 1979
 Armand Salacrou - 1963, 1966
 Sergei Vasilyev - 1956, 1959
 Sergei Yutkevich - 1955, 1958
 Veljko Bulajić - 1968, 1969, 1980
 Emir Kusturica - 1993, 2005

See also 

 Cannes Film Festival#Juries
 List of Cannes Film Festival jury presidents

References

External links 
 

Cannes Film Festival
Lists of film festivals in Europe